T. rosea may refer to:
 Tabebuia rosea, the roble de Sabana, a neotropical tree species
 Tephrosia rosea, a legume species

See also
 Rosea (disambiguation)